The term 'political participation' has a very wide meaning. It is not only related to 'Right to Vote', but simultaneously relates to participation in: decision-making process, political activism, political consciousness, etc. 
Women in India participate in voting, run for public offices and political parties at lower levels more than men. Political activism and voting are the strongest areas of women's political participation. To combat gender inequality in politics, the Indian Government has instituted reservations for seats in local governments. 

Women turnout during India's parliamentary general elections was 65.63%, compared to 67.09% turnout for men.
India ranks 20th from the bottom in terms of representation of women in Parliament.
Women have held the posts of president and prime minister in  India, as well as chief ministers of various states. Indian voters have elected women to numerous state legislative assemblies and national parliament for many decades.

Constitutional rights of women 
The Constitution of India establishes a parliamentary system of government, and guarantees its citizens the right to be elected, freedom of speech, freedom to assemble and form associations, and vote. The Constitution of India attempts to remove gender inequalities by banning discrimination based on sex and class, prohibiting human trafficking and forced labour, and reserving elected positions for women.

The Government of India directed state and local governments to promote equality by class and gender including equal pay and free legal aid, humane working conditions and maternity relief, rights to work and education, and raising the standard of living. Women were substantially involved in the Indian independence movement in the early 20th century and advocated for independence from Britain. Independence brought gender equality in the form of constitutional rights, but historically women's political participation has remained low.

Female Participation

Voting 
The movement for women’s suffrage began in the early 1900s in response to a national movement for suffrage, even though vast majority of neither men nor women had a right to vote  the British colonial rule before 1947. After Indian independence from Britain, the Indian Constitution in 1950 officially granted women and men suffrage. Prior to universal suffrage, provincial legislatures had granted women the right to vote.

Madras was the first to grant women’s suffrage in 1921, but only to those men and women who owned land property according to British administration's records. The rights granted in response to the movement towards suffrage were limited to qualifications of literacy and property ownership, including property ownership of husbands. This excluded vast majority of Indian women and men from voting, because they were poor. This changed in 1950 when universal suffrage was granted to all adult Indian citizens.

In 1950, universal suffrage granted voting rights to all women. This is enshrined in Article 326 in the Indian constitution. India is a parliamentary system with two houses: Lok Sabha (lower house) and Rajya Sabha (upper house). Rates of participation among women in 1962 were 46.63% for Lok Sabha elections and rose to a high in 1984 of 58.60%. Male turnout during that same period was 63.31% in 1962 and 68.18% in 1984.

The gap between men and women voters has narrowed over time with a difference of 16.7% in 1962 to 4.4% in 2009.

Voter turnout for national elections in the past 50 years has remained stagnant with turnout ranging between 50 and 60%. State elections have seen a growing trend in women's participation, and in some cases women's turnout is exceeding male turnout.  Increased turnout of women was reported for the 2012 Vidhan Sabha elections (legislative/state assemblies) with states such as Uttar Pradesh reporting 58.82% to 60.29% turnout. In the 2013 assembly elections, women’s overall turnout was reported to be 47.4%, and male turnout was 52.5%.  Indian states of Arunachal Pradesh, Goa, Kerala, Manipur, Meghalaya, Mizoram, Daman and Diu, and Puducherry all reported higher turnouts among women than men in 2013.

Increased participation is occurring in both rich and poor states in India. The sex ratio of voters has improved from 715 female voters for every 1,000 male voters in the 1960s to 883 female voters in the 2000s. The Election Commission of India (ECI) has sought to increase voter turnout by cleaning up electoral rolls and removing missing or deceased members. Voter outreach has included door-to-door voter registration, and in 2014 elections, voters will be issued a photo id with polling station information to increase voter turnout. Increased voter turnout in India is also partially due to the women voters.  ECI has sought to encourage voter registration among women and participation through education and outreach on college and university campuses. Growing participation has also been attributed to increased security at polling stations.

2014 elections
Women turnout during India's 2014 parliamentary general elections was 65.63%, compared to 67.09% turnout for men. In 16 out of 29 states of India, more women voted than men. A total of 260.6 million women exercised their right to vote in April–May 2014 elections for India's parliament.

Running for public office 

India has a federal form of government, with devolved powers. The electorate votes to elect a national parliament as well as state assemblies. In 2012, India had a minimal percentage of 10.9% women elected representatives in the national parliament, which is, but relatively higher than Hungary (8.8%), Brazil (9.6%), China (9.1%), and Malaysia (9.8%).

A broader measure of political participation includes number of women candidates who compete for elections and women in state assemblies. According to World Economic Forum's annual global gender gap index studies, which considers such a broader scale, India has ranked in top 20 countries worldwide for many years, with 9th best in 2013 - a score reflecting more women's participation in India's political process than Denmark, Switzerland, Germany, France and United Kingdom.

To remedy low participation of women electors, India in 1994 established quotas (reservations) in constitutional amendments (73rd and 74th) to reserve 33% of seats in local governments for women.  The Women’s Reservation Bill (108th amendment) has been introduced in the national parliament to reserve 33% of Lok Sabha and Vidhan Sabha seats for women.  The bill has yet to be passed by Lok Sabha and signed into law. The discussion of women’s reservations began in the 1920s and continued into the 1930s until a compromise was reached with Britain to allow women in urban areas to vote. Discussion of women’s reservations were again introduced in 1974 by the United Nations Commission on the Status of Women in India, but India did not fully establish quotas in local government until 1994. Local governing bodies in India are called Panchayati Raj Institutions (PRI) and one-third of seats and leadership positions must be reserved for women. States such as Andhra Pradesh, Bihar, Chhattisgarh, Jharkhand, Kerala, Maharashtra, Orissa, Rajasthan, Tripura, and Uttarakhand have increased reservations to 50%. The national government has also proposed to raise the level of reservations in PRIs to 50%.

Seats reserved for women are rotated for assurance that each seat has an equal chance of being reserved. After the establishment of women's reservations, political participation went from 4-5% to 25-40% among women, and gave millions of women the opportunity to serve as leaders in local government. Odisha, an Indian state, established reservations prior to the 73rd amendment and they had 28,069 women elected in 1992 and 28,595 women in 1997. Class differences have manifested with poorer women gaining presence in panchayats, but women of a higher class being elected as chairpersons (sarpanch).

Concerns remain in reserving seats for women in elected positions. The issue of training has become an increasing concern with preparing women for the role of leadership. It was found in Tamil Nadu that women lack the education and training to understand procedures in panchayats. Family also plays a significant role in women's participation in government. Familial influence can be a barrier or a support system for female elected officials in terms of connections. Family connections can help women seek elected positions at both the national and local government level. There has been concern over the role of women as proxies for male family members, but women may still have important effects on policy decisions.  The effect of reservation for women has been increased in the number of public goods, including water and roads. Drinking water and road improvements are issues that are most frequently raised by female elected officials. The most significant issues for men are roads, irrigation, education, and water.  Women are also likely to bring welfare issues such as violence against women, childcare, and maternal health to consideration.

Political parties 

India has a multi-party system with the 7 registered parties at the national level. The three largest parties in India are the Indian National Congress (INC), the Bharatiya Janata Party (BJP), and the Communist Party of India (CPI). Political parties have increased outreach among women voters as India's party system has become more competitive. This has included the creation of women's wings in the largest parties. The BJP's wing is the BJP Mahila Morcha, the INC's wing is All India Mahila Congress, and the CPI's wing is the National Federation of Indian Women.

Women's involvement in political parties is tied to the increasing demand for equal rights. The INC held power until the 1990s. As the INC moved away from welfare politics, other parties arose to challenge the INC using poverty as the center of their agenda. The INC regained power in 2004 with the help of women's participation. The INC has increased women's participation by instituting a 33% quota for women in all levels of the party. In June 2009, the INC nominated a woman to become first speaker of Lok Sabha, and also supported the election of Pratibha Patil, India's first female president. Women were involved in the early establishment of the BJP. The BJP has encouraged greater representation of women by developing women's leadership programs, financial assistance for women candidates, and implementing a 33% reservation for women in party leadership positions. BJP has received women's support by focusing on issues such as the Uniform Civil Code to extend equal rights to women and men regardless of religion. They have also spoken out against violence against Indian women.  The CPI has also supported gender inequality issues including addressing issues of violence nikita ekta ullu through the National Federation of Indian Women.

Women's participation in political parties remained low in the 1990s with 10-12% membership consisting of women. Indian women have also taken the initiative to form their own political parties, and in 2007, the United Women Front party was created, and has advocated for increasing the reservation of seats for women in parliament to 50%.  Women only govern four of India's political parties. From 1980 to 1970, 4.3% of candidates and 70% of electoral races had no women candidates at all.  As of 2013, it has been reported of the members of parliament 11% were women in Lok Sabha and 10.6% in Rajya Sabha.

50:50 Female Candidates
In 2019 Indian general election, Naam Tamilar Katchi from Tamil Nadu fielded 50 per cent women candidates in the total 40 Lok Sabha seats. It was the first party in India offered equal number of seats to men and women. And in the 2021 Tamil Nadu Legislative Assembly election also they followed the same 50:50 ratio by offered 117 seats to women in the total of 234 assembly constituencies.

Political activism 
Women's organisations in India first began to emerge in the early 1900s, and later in the 1970s after a period of limited activity from the 1950s to 1970s.  One of the earliest women's organisations, Bharat Stree Mahamandal, formed in 1910 and focused on helping women escape oppression from men. Women's associations had traditionally began with the help of men giving few women access to work and education, while limiting the expansion of traditional gender roles. In 1927, the All India Women's Conference (AIWC) was formed to advocate for women's education and was helpful in the passage of the Hindu Code of Bills between 1952 and 1960. Women were also active in the freedom movement in protesting British colonial rule over Indian holding protests and public meetings in support of independence.

The new wave of feminism in the 1970s was in response to gender inequality issues and stagnant development in India. The Committee on the Status of Women in India released a report in 1974, and had a significant influence in the reemergence of activism towards gender equality. The report highlighted the significant differences between men and women in India, including the disparity in the sex ratio, mortality rates, employment, literacy, and wage discrimination. The report fueled the women's movement by signifying the ongoing discrimination towards women in India. Gender inequality has remained the focus of the women's movement with specific emphasis on issues such as the Uniform Civil Code, Women's Reservation Bill, and sexual violence against women. Women's organizations both informal and formal have developed at the rural, urban, national, and state levels in India. Women's organizations in India address a variety of issues from the environment, poverty, empowerment, and violence against women.  One of the most prominent women's organizations in India is the AIWC, which was established in 1927, focusing on empowering and educating Indian women. The AIWC has over 100,000 members and 500 branches in India, and has helped with the passage of the Sarda Act, Maternity Benefit Act, and Hindu Code Bills.

Indian women are significantly involved at the grass roots level of activism. The Chipko movement that arose in the 1970s is one example of success among the women's movement in India, as women protested the deforestation in Uttarakhand leading to the protection of the region. Since the Indian independence, women's organizations have focused on issues of violence towards women. Women's movements have focused on rape, female mortality rates, female foeticide, dowry deaths, sati, and domestic abuse. Tragedies such as the Mathura rape case in 1972, the dowry death of Tarvinder Kaur in 1979, the death of Roop Kanwar by practice of sati in 1987, the gang rape of Bhanwari Devi in 1992, and the New Delhi gang rape case in 2012, have kept the movement focused on rape and given rise to many women's organizations at the local and national level.

Challenges to women's participation 
The level and forms of women's participation in politics is largely shaped by cultural and societal barriers in the form of violence, discrimination and illiteracy.

Sexual violence
Martha Nussbaum highlighted a significant barrier to women's capability of participating in politics to be the threat of violence. Sexual violence in India is exacerbated by issues of education and marriage. Women are sexually abused. Child marriage, domestic violence and low literacy rates have lowered Indian women's economic opportunities and contributed to sexual violence in India.  A 2011 study found, "24% of Indian men have committed sexual violence at some point in their lives, 20% have forced their partners to have sex with them...38% of men admitting they had physically abused their partners." Widespread sexual violence is attributed to the fact that violence within marriage is not against the law, and sexual violence goes largely unpunished.  Martha C. Nussbaum states that "In the larger society, violence and the threat of violence affects many women's ability to participate actively in many forms of social and political relationship, to speak in public,  to be recognized as dignified beings whose worth is equal to that of others."

Discrimination
Although the Constitution of India removed gender inequalities among caste and gender, discrimination continues to be a widespread barrier to women's political participation. A 2012 study of 3,000 Indian women found the barriers in participation, specifically in running for political office, in the form of illiteracy, work burdens within the household, and discriminatory attitudes towards women as leaders. Discriminatory attitudes manifest in the limitations presented to Indian women including low access to information and resources. Women rely on receiving information from family or village members, typically men. Women also lack leadership experience due to the fact they are burdened with household duties. The burden of household duties is a significant reason why many Indian women do not participate. Unlike men, there are fewer opportunities for women to get involved in organizations to gain leadership skills. There is little public space for them as men have dominated the political arena for many years in India.

Discrimination is further perpetuated by class. Dalit women, of the lowest caste in India, are continually discriminated against in running for public office. The Government of India requires reservation of seats for Dalits and Scheduled Castes, but women suffer from abuse and discrimination when serving as elected officials. Dalit women experience harassment by being denied information, ignored or silenced in meetings, and in some cases petitioned to be removed from their elected position.

Illiteracy
India is only the largest illiterate populations. In January 2014, the United Nations reported 25.6 percent of all adults in India are illiterate. Literacy among Indian women is 65.46%, which is much lower than literacy among men reported at 82.14%. illiteracy limits the ability of women to understand the political system and issues. Problems with exploitation, such as women being left off of voters list, have been reported as illiteracy limits the ability of women to ensure their political rights are exercised. Martial concerning political participation stated, "Because literacy is connected in general with the ability to move outside the home and to stand on one's own outside of it, it is also connected to the ability of women to meet and collaborate with other women." Studies conducted by Niraja Jayal and Nirmala Buch found women are "persistently mocked and devalued in the panchayats if they are illiterate." Nussbaum also found literacy can play a key role in the dignification and independence of women in politics by giving them access to communications, such as memos and newspapers, they can become better informed on political issues.

Overcoming barriers to participation
To overcome issues of discrimination and violence, women's organizations have focused on the empowerment of Indian women. Empowerment is tied to the support of family and improved status within the household, which is undermined by the threat of domestic and sexual violence. Socio-economic conditions, such as poverty and illiteracy, prevent the entrance of women into running for public office, and even voting. Inability to understand the rules of Panchayat Raj undermines the self-confidence to participation in public office. Empowerment of Indian women can also occur through "bridging gaps in education, renegotiating gender roles, the gender division of labour and addressing biased attitudes". Women can also be empowered to participate by family, and when familial support is present they are more likely to run for office.

The Government of India has addressed the issue of empowerment by consolidating all programmes for women under the National Mission of Empowerment of Women (NMEW). The mission of NMEW is to "enhance economic empowerment of girls and women through skill development, micro credit, vocational training and entrepreneurship." In 2001, the Government of India passed the National Policy for the Empowerment of Women. The policy focuses on "the advancement, development, and empowerment of women." Specifically, the policy focuses on ending gender inequality and violence against women. The United Nations has also encouraged empowerment among India women by campaigning to end violence against women in India.

See also
Women in India
Women in government
Women's suffrage
Women's Reservation Bill
Reserved political positions in India
United Women Front
All India Women's Conference
Violence against women in India
Domestic Violence in India
Gender discrimination in India
Gender inequality in India

References

 
Women in India